Dominik Bacher (born 19 June 2002) is a German footballer who currently plays as a forward for TSV 1860 Rosenheim on loan from SpVgg Unterhaching.

Career
He joined 1860 Rosenheim on loan in September 2020.

Career statistics

Club

Notes

References

2002 births
Living people
German footballers
Association football forwards
3. Liga players
SpVgg Unterhaching players